Charles E. Choate (August 31, 1865 – November 16, 1929) was a U.S. architect who worked in Georgia, Florida, and Alabama. He designed numerous buildings that are listed on the U.S. National Register of Historic Places.

He was born Charles Edward on August 31, 1865, in Houston County, Georgia.  He studied at the University of Georgia.  His niece was Macon architect Ellamae Ellis League. He died in Maysville, Kentucky in 1929.

Works
His works include:

First Methodist Episcopal Church (1907), junction of Third Ave. and Third St., Stillmore, Georgia, NRHP-listed
Holt Brothers Banking Company Building, 100-106 Malone St., Sandersville, GA, NRHP-listed
James E. Johnson House, 425 W. Church St., Sandersville, GA, NRHP-listed
James Kelley House, Tennille-Harrison Rd. E of jct. with GA 15, Tennille, GA, NRHP-listed
Charles Madden House, 302 E. South Central St., Tennille, GA
Park Street Methodist Episcopal Church, South, 793 Park St., SW., Atlanta, GA, NRHP-listed
Ferdinand A. Ricks House, S. Collins and E. Calhoun Sts., Reynolds, GA, NRHP-listed
Thomas W. Smith House, 306 N. Main St., Tennille, GA, NRHP-listed

Tennille Banking Company Building, 102-104 N. Main St., Tennille, GA, NRHP-listed
Tennille Baptist Church, 201-205 N. Main St., Tennille, GA, NRHP-listed
Washington Manufacturing Company, Between E. Montgomery and Church Sts. at White Line St., Tennille, GA, NRHP-listed
Wrightsville and Tennille Railroad Company Building, 119 Central Ave., Tennille, GA, NRHP-listed
Three contributing buildings in North Harris Street Historic District, roughly bounded by First Ave., Washington Ave., E. McCarty St., N. Harris St., Malone St., and Warthen St., Sandersville, GA, NRHP-listed

References

External links

19th-century American architects
People from Tennille, Georgia
1865 births
1929 deaths
Architects from Georgia (U.S. state)
20th-century American architects